Gabriel Goldschmied (born 22 April 1939) is a Mexican judoka. He competed in the men's middleweight event at the 1964 Summer Olympics.

References

1939 births
Living people
Mexican male judoka
Olympic judoka of Mexico
Judoka at the 1964 Summer Olympics
Place of birth missing (living people)
Pan American Games medalists in judo
Pan American Games bronze medalists for Mexico
Judoka at the 1967 Pan American Games
Medalists at the 1967 Pan American Games
20th-century Mexican people
21st-century Mexican people